Senátor 21 (SEN 21) is a political movement established in 2017 by Senator Václav Láska. The party's candidate Tomáš Goláň won the 2018 Zlín by-election.

The party joined the European Democratic Party in February 2019.

Election results

Senate

Footnotes

External links
 Senátor 21 official website

Liberal parties in the Czech Republic
Political parties established in 2017
Pro-European political parties in the Czech Republic
Syncretic political movements
European Democratic Party
2017 establishments in the Czech Republic
Senator 21